Le Travailleur de Lot-et-Garonne ('The Worker of Lot-et-Garonne') is a communist weekly newspaper published from Agen, France. The first issue of Le Travailleur de Lot-et-Garonne was published on October 4, 1919. The newspaper, then an organ of the local socialists of Agen under the leadership of Renaud Jean, survived its initial period by enlisting 500 subscribers (mainly railway workers).

References

1919 establishments in France
Defunct newspapers published in France
Defunct weekly newspapers
French-language communist newspapers
History of the French Communist Party
Mass media in Agen
Publications established in 1919
Publications with year of disestablishment missing
Weekly newspapers published in France